= Creepy Scarlett =

- Creepy Scarlett (Volume #1 cover ) (July 2012); Cover art by Ozzy Longoria edited by Jessica Jimerson

Publication information
- Publisher: IndyPlanet (#1–8); Graeme Buchan; IndyPlanet (#4–current)
- Schedule: --
- Format: Ongoing series
- Genre: Horror
- No. of issues: (vol. 1); 8

Creative team
- Created by: Graeme Buchan
- Written by: Graeme Buchan
- Inker(s): Felipe Sanhueza Marambio; J.C. Grande; Ozzy Longoria; Keith Perkins; Nadica Boskovska
- Letterer: Jessica M. Jimerson
- Colorist: Jessica M. Jimerson
- Editor(s): Graeme Buchan, Jessica M. Jimerson

Creepy Scarlett is an eight-issue comic book series written and self-published by Graeme Buchan. The unusual art style variations, give the comic an almost college flair, while simultaneously remaining consistent with the story arc. It was released through Indie Comics, for its first record of public distribution.

The plot revolves around an odd girl named Scarlett, who lives in a graveyard and seeks revenge on those who have wronged her.

Creepy Scarlett features contributions from a number of artists including Felipe Sanhueza Marambio, Jessica M. Jimerson, J.C. Grande, Ozzy Longoria, Keith Perkins, Nadica Boskovska and others. Which add to the comic series, art style variation, from chapter to chapter, showing atmosphere changes along with the plot. While the list of inking and other artist is revolving, writer/creator Graeme Buchan, and colorist/letterer Jessica Jimerson are mundane to the project, working on it throughout the current three issues.

== Plot ==
The story revolves a "creepy girl" named Scarlett, who lives in a graveyard just beyond a small town. Scarlett lives there alone with her only companion Mr. Ted, who she talks to frequently. In the first issue it is revealed that the townspeople have wronged her, along with a shady organization called "The Order of the Red Sun". Scarlett battles a variety of nemeses and later reveals she will have revenge, on everyone involved in her mysterious tragedy. However the seemingly immortal girl becomes nothing more than a fairytale to those without any direct history with her.

"In volume #1 Scarlett faces serial killer Pumpkinface and the return of her nemesis Vincent Priest, head of the Red Sun Corporation. We then head back to 1968 as Scarlett unwittingly unleashes a horde of zombies into town and must put aside her hatred to rescue the townsfolk."

== List of characters ==
- Creepy Scarlett

The main protagonist of the comic series. A misfit and unusual girl that refused to fit in with the town's strict codes and rules. When she mysteriously disappeared nobody showed much concern. However, when she returned everyone feared her and rightly so.

- Mr. Ted

Scarlett's only companion, a strange-looking teddy bear that listens to her every word. Mr. Ted has been kidnapped and recovered apparently on more than one occasion to which Scarlett has rescued him. Mr. Ted is also missing an eye.

- Pumpkinface

A serial killer awaiting execution, Jack was hired by Vincent Priest to capture Scarlett. After years of failure and losses to Scarlett nobody is sure if "Jack" is still the same man, a cybernetic organism or even a clone.

- Vincent Priest

Scarlett's nemesis and CEO of the Red Sun Corporation. His journey to gain immortality leads him to a small town and to Scarlett. His experiments lead to Scarlett's death and her subsequent vengeful return.

- Lisa Bliss

Lisa thought the stories of Scarlett were just a myth until she crossed paths with Pumpkinface and Scarlett. She is also about to find out her ties to Scarlett and her becoming a target of Vincent priest as a possible replacement for Scarlett in his experiments.

- Nadia

Assistant and assassin. She makes coffee and kills people for Vincent Priest.

- Trixie Treat

Trixie's demeanor is misleading and she rules over the freak show with an iron fist... actually an oversized toy hammer. She enjoys playing pranks and occasional torture.

== Editions ==
- Creepy Scarlett Scarlett vs. Zombies Volume #1 (Indy Planet, 2012)
- Creepy Scarlett The Emerald of Lucifer #1 (Indy Planet, 2012)
- Creepy Scarlett As White As Snow pt1 #2 (Indy Planet, 2012)
- Creepy Scarlett As White As Snow pt2 #3 (Indy Planet, 2013)
- Creepy Scarlett Book One (Indy Planet, 2013)
